Aidaralash is a creek located in the Aktobe region of Ural mountains. The Global Boundary Stratotype Section and Point (GSSP) for Carboniferous-Permian boundary and base for the Asselian period is located here.

References

Ural Mountains
Aktobe Region